The Adelec Buildings located at 28-36 High Street, on the corner of Henry Street in Fremantle, Western Australia. The heritage listed buildings  were constructed in 1906 during the gold boom period by the trustees of Captain Edward Henry Fothergills estate.

For many years 32 High Street was known as Fothergill's Building. The buildings were designed by the architect F.W.Burwell and constructed by J McCracken.

It is a two-storey rendered and iron commercial corner building constructed in the Federation Free Classical style of architecture. The rendered walls have an ashlar effect with pilasters incorporating decorative capitols. The first floor has decorative pilasters with stucco arches and a keystone above the semi circular fanlight with two matching timber casement windows located below. There is a corrugated iron hipped roof behind the parapet with the words Adelec Building inscribed on the corner.

There have been many tenants, including The Sunday Times and The Daily News. The Daily News moved their Fremantle offices into the building from further down High Street in 1908.

The buildings are listed on the Register of the National Estate, and are part of the Fremantle West End Heritage area.

See also
 List of heritage places in Fremantle

References

Buildings and structures in Fremantle
High Street, Fremantle
State Register of Heritage Places in the City of Fremantle
Fremantle West End Heritage area